The Golden Melody Award for Best Band is an award given by the Ministry of Culture of Taiwan. It was first presented in 2001. Mayday which is a band got the award before.

Winners and nominees

References

Golden Melody Awards